Mohammed Yusuf Khan (11 December 1922 – 7 July 2021), better known by his stage name Dilip Kumar, was an Indian actor who worked in Hindi cinema. Credited with pioneering method acting in cinema, he dominated the Indian movie scene from late 1940s throughout 1960s, being referred to as Abhinay Samrat (Hindi for "Emperor of Acting") by the audience. Kumar holds the record for most wins for the Filmfare Award for Best Actor (eight, which was later equalled by Shah Rukh Khan) and was also the inaugural recipient of the award. He holds the most dominant box-office record for a star (male or female) in Hindi cinema with over eighty-percent box-office successes and several long-standing gross records.

In a career spanning over five decades, Kumar worked in less than 60 films in a variety of roles. He debuted as an actor in the film Jwar Bhata (1944), produced by Bombay Talkies. Following a series of unsuccessful ventures, he had his first box office hit in Jugnu (1947). Kumar found further success with the romantic Andaz (1949), the swashbuckling Aan (1952), the social drama Daag (1952), the dramatic Devdas (1955), the comical Azaad (1955), the romantic social Naya Daur (1957), the noir mystery Madhumati (1958), the comedy-drama Paigham (1959) the epic historical Mughal-E-Azam (1960), the social dacoit crime drama Gunga Jumna (1961), and the comedy drama Ram Aur Shyam (1967). All three Andaz, Aan   and Naya Daur briefly became the highest-grossing Indian film up to that point, a feat later achieved by Mughal-e-Azam, which sustained the record for 15 years.

The 1970s saw Kumar's career take a downturn, marked by three consecutive commercial underperformers, namely Dastaan (1972), Sagina (1974) and Bairaag (1976). Post 1976, he went on a four-year hiatus from film performances and returned with the revolutionary drama Kranti, which was the highest-grossing Indian film of the year. He continued to play leading roles in films such as Shakti (1982), Karma (1986), and Saudagar (1991). His last on-screen appearance was in the commercially unsuccessful Qila (1998), which saw him in a dual role. Kumar later served as a member of the Rajya Sabha, the upper house of India's parliament, from 2000 to 2006.

Kumar's personal life was the subject of much media attention, however, he himself had largely avoided media limelight and endorsements. He was in a long-term relationship with actress and frequent co-star Madhubala that ended after the Naya Daur court case in 1957. He married actress Saira Banu in 1966 and resided in Bandra, a suburb of Mumbai, until his death in 2021. For his contributions to film, the Government of India awarded him with the Padma Bhushan in 1991 and the Padma Vibhushan in 2015, the country's third and second-highest civilian awards respectively. He was also awarded India's highest accolade in the field of cinema, the Dadasaheb Phalke Award in 1994. In 1998, the Government of Pakistan conferred Kumar with Nishan-e-Imtiaz, their highest civilian decoration, making him the only Indian to have received the honour. The house that Kumar grew up in, located in Peshawar, was declared a national heritage monument in 2014 by the Pakistani government.

Early life
Dilip Kumar was born as Mohammad Yusuf Khan on 11 December 1922, into a Hindko-speaking Awan Muslim family at his family home in the Qissa Khawani Bazaar neighbourhood of Peshawar, a city in the North-West Frontier Province of British India. He was one of the twelve children of Lala Ghulam Sarwar Khan and his wife Ayesha Begum. His father was a fruit merchant.

Khan was schooled at the Barnes School in Deolali (now in Maharashtra), where his father owned orchards. He grew up in the same neighbourhood in Peshawar as Raj Kapoor, his childhood friend, and later his colleague in the film industry. In 1940, he moved to Pune and set up a dry fruit supply shop and a canteen. Despite hailing from Peshawar, Khan's family decided to remain in Bombay following the partition of the India in 1947.

Khan never acted under his birth name, debuting in Jwar Bhata in 1944 under the stage name Dilip Kumar. In his autobiography, Dilip Kumar: The Substance and the Shadow, he wrote that the name was a suggestion from Devika Rani, who was one of the producers on Jwar Bhata. In an interview in 1970, he said that he adopted this name out of fear of his father, who never approved of his acting career because of the general poor image of cinema back then.

Career

1940s: First film roles and initial success

Kumar's first film was Jwar Bhata in 1944, which went unnoticed. After two more unsuccessful films, it was his fourth film Jugnu (1947), in which he starred alongside Noor Jehan, that became his first major hit at the box office. His next major hits were the 1948 films Shaheed and Mela. Both Jugnu and Shaheed were the highest grossing Hindi films of their respective year of release.

He got his breakthrough role as an actor in 1949 with Mehboob Khan's Andaz, in which he starred alongside Raj Kapoor and Nargis. At the time of its release, Andaz was the highest-grossing Indian film ever, until its record was broken by Kapoor's Barsaat that same year. Shabnam was another box office hit that was also released in 1949.

1950s: Breakthrough years
The 1950s was Kumar's most successful and prolific decade with him playing leading roles in several box office hits such as Jogan (1950), Babul (1950), Deedar (1951), Tarana (1951), Daag (1952), Aan (1952), Uran Khatola (1955), Insaniyat (1955), Devdas (1955), Naya Daur (1957), Yahudi (1958), Madhumati (1958) and Paigham (1959). 
He formed popular on-screen pairings with many of the top actresses at the time including Vyjayanthimala, Madhubala, Nargis, Nimmi, Meena Kumari and Kamini Kaushal.
Together with fellow contemporaries Raj Kapoor and Dev Anand, he dominated the 1950s which is considered a part of the golden era of Hindi cinema. Though the three did not appear in any one film together, Kumar did appear with Raj Kapoor in  Andaz (1949) and Dev Anand in Insaniyat.

Several of his films established his screen image as the "Tragedy King". Kumar briefly suffered from depression due to portraying many tragic roles and on the advice of his psychiatrist, he also took on light-hearted roles. Mehboob Khan's big-budget 1952 swashbuckling musical Aan featured him in one of his first lighter roles and marked his first film to be shot in technicolor. Aan was the first Indian film to have a wide release across Europe with a lavish premiere in London. Aan was the highest-grossing Indian film ever at the time, domestically and overseas. He had further success with lighter roles as a thief in the comedy Azaad (1955), and as a royal prince in the musical Kohinoor (1960). By this time, he had developed his distinct, signature style of understated acting of mumbling his dialogues while giving myriad expressions and meanings to lines that his characters uttered.

He was the first actor to win the Filmfare Best Actor Award (for Daag) and went on to win it a further seven times. 9 of his 21 films in the 1950s were ranked in the Top 30 highest-grossing films of the decade.

1960s: Mughal-e-Azam and venture into production
In 1960, he portrayed Prince Salim in K. Asif's big-budget epic historical film Mughal-e-Azam, which was the highest-grossing film in Indian film history for 15 years until it was surpassed by the 1975 film Sholay.

The film was originally shot in black and white, with only two songs and the climax scenes shot in colour. 44 years after its original release, it was fully colourised and theatrically re-released in 2004 and was once again a box office success.

In 1961, Kumar wrote, produced, and starred in Ganga Jamuna opposite his brother Nasir Khan, playing the title roles. Kumar produced the film under his production company Citizens and it would be the only film he produced. He chose the shade of saree that his co-star Vyjayanthimala would wear in every scene. The film received the National Film Award for Second Best Feature Film in Hindi, the Paul Revere Silver Bowl at the Boston International Film Festival, the Special Honour Diploma from the Czechoslovak Academy of Arts in Prague, and the Special Prize at the Karlovy Vary International Film Festival.

In 1962, British director David Lean offered him the role of "Sherif Ali" in his film  Lawrence of Arabia (1962), but Kumar declined to perform in the movie. The role eventually went to Omar Sharif, the Egyptian actor. Kumar commented in his much later released autobiography, "he thought Omar Sharif had played the role far better than he himself could have". Kumar was also being considered for a leading role opposite Elizabeth Taylor in a film that Lean was working on called Taj Mahal, before the project was cancelled.

His next film Leader (1964) was a below-average grosser at the box office. Kumar was also credited with writing the story of this film. His next film Dil Diya Dard Liya (1966) was Kumar's first box office flop in a decade. It was rumoured that he had ghost directed the film but the final credit was given to Abdul Rashid Kardar. In 1967, Kumar played a dual role of twins separated at birth in the hit film Ram Aur Shyam. In 1968, he starred alongside Manoj Kumar in Aadmi which was an average grosser at the box office. That same year, he starred in Sunghursh with Vyjayanthimala which was their last film together which created a total of seven hit films together.

1970s: Career slump
In 1970, Kumar played the title role in Gopi which marked his first pairing with wife Saira Banu and was a box office success. That same year, he acted opposite Banu again in the Bengali language film Sagina Mahato. This was his only appearance in a Bengali film. In 1972, he once again played dual roles as twin brothers in Dastaan which was a box office flop and began a decline in Kumar's career as a leading man. A Hindi remake of Sagina Mahato, simply titled Sagina was made in 1974 with both Kumar and Banu reprising their roles which also failed to do well at the box office. In 1976, he played triple roles as a father and twin sons in Bairaag. Though his performance in triple roles was acclaimed, the film was his third consecutive failure at the box office. He personally regarded M. G. Ramachandran's performance in Enga Veettu Pillai better than his role in Ram Aur Shyam. He regards his performance in Bairaag much higher than that of Ram Aur Shyam. The rise of actors like Rajesh Khanna, Amitabh Bachchan and Sanjeev Kumar led to Kumar losing film offers from 1970 to 1980. He took a five-year hiatus from films from 1976 to 1981.

1980s: Return to success
In 1981, he returned to films as a character actor playing mature elderly roles. His comeback film was the star-studded historical epic Kranti which was the biggest hit of the year. Appearing alongside an ensemble cast including Manoj Kumar, Shashi Kapoor, Hema Malini and Shatrughan Sinha, he played the title role as a revolutionary fighting for India's independence from British rule. In the post-Kranti phase, Kumar reinvented himself to play the "Angry Old Man" to great effect in a series of films like Vidhaata (1982), Shakti (1982), Duniya (1984), etc. In 1982, he collaborated with director Subhash Ghai for the first time with Vidhaata, in which he starred alongside Sanjay Dutt, Sanjeev Kumar and Shammi Kapoor. Vidhaata was the highest grossing film of the year. Later that year he starred alongside Amitabh Bachchan in Ramesh Sippy's Shakti, which was an average grosser at the box office, but won him critical acclaim and his eighth and final Filmfare Award for Best Actor. In 1984, he starred in Yash Chopra's social crime drama Mashaal opposite Anil Kapoor, which failed at the box office, but his performance was critically acclaimed. He also appeared alongside Rishi Kapoor in Duniya (1984) and Jeetendra in Dharm Adhikari (1986).

His second collaboration with Subhash Ghai came with the 1986 ensemble action film Karma. Karma marked the first film which paired him opposite fellow veteran actress Nutan, although they were paired in an incomplete and unreleased film in the 1950s titled Shikwa. He acted opposite Nutan again in the 1989 action film Kanoon Apna Apna which also reunited him with Sanjay Dutt.

1990s: Directorial debut and final works
In 1990, he co-starred with Govinda in the action thriller Izzatdaar. In 1991, Kumar starred alongside fellow veteran actor Raaj Kumar in Saudagar, his third and last film with director Subhash Ghai. This was his second film with Raaj Kumar after 1959's Paigham. Saudagar was to be Kumar's penultimate film and last box office success. In 1994, he won the Filmfare Lifetime Achievement Award for his contributions to the industry.

In 1991, producer Sudhakar Bokade who had previously worked with Kumar in Izzatdaar announced a film titled Kalinga which would officially mark Kumar's directorial debut after he had allegedly previously ghost directed Ganga Jamuna (1961) and Dil Diya Dard Liya (1967). Kumar was also set to star in the title role with the cast including Raj Babbar, Raj Kiran, Amitoj Mann and Meenakshi Seshadri. After being delayed for several years Kalinga was eventually shelved in 1996 with 70% filming completed.

In 1998, Kumar made his last film appearance in the box office flop Qila, where he played dual roles as an evil landowner who is murdered and as his twin brother who tries to solve the mystery of his death.

2000s–2021: Shelved projects and political career
In 2001, Kumar was set to appear in a film titled Asar – The Impact alongside Ajay Devgan and Priyanka Chopra, which was shelved due to Kumar's declining health. He was also set to appear in Subhash Ghai's war film Mother Land, alongside Amitabh Bachchan and Shah Rukh Khan, but this film was shelved after Khan decided to leave the project.

His classic films Mughal-e-Azam and Naya Daur were fully colourised and re-released in cinemas in 2004 and 2008 respectively. An unreleased film he had shot and completed titled Aag Ka Dariya was set for a theatrical release in 2013 but has not been released to date.

Kumar was a member of the Rajya Sabha, the upper house of India's parliament, from 2000 to 2006. He was nominated by the Indian National Congress to represent Maharashtra. Kumar utilised a significant portion of his MPLADS fund towards the construction and improvement of the Bandstand Promenade and the gardens at Bandra Fort at Lands End in Bandra.

Personal life

Kumar and Madhubala were drawn to each other during the shooting of Tarana (1951). They remained in a relationship for seven years until the Naya Daur court case, during which Kumar testified against Madhubala and her father, ending their relationship. They never worked together again after Mughal-e-Azam (1960). Kumar later expressed in his autobiography, "Was I in love with Madhubala as the newspapers and magazines reported at that time? As an answer to this oft-repeated question straight from the horse’s mouth, I must admit that I was attracted to her both as a fine co-star and as a person who had some of the attributes I hoped to find in a woman at that age and time...She, as I said earlier, was very sprightly and vivacious and, as such, she could draw me out of my shyness and reticence effortlessly." However, Kumar shared in his biography that contrary to popular notion, Madhubala’s father Ataullah Khan wasn’t opposed to their match but instead, wanted to turn this marriage into a business venture which did not land well with him.

In the late 1950s, Vyjayanthimala was linked by gossip magazines to Kumar, who has acted with her the most compared to any other actress, which resulted in great on-screen chemistry between them. While working for his home production Gunga Jumna (1961), Kumar reportedly handpicked the shade of sari that Vyjayanthimala would wear in every scene.

In 1966, Kumar married actress Saira Banu, who was 22 years younger than him. He later married Hyderabad socialite Asma Rahman, taking her as a second wife in 1981. That marriage ended in January 1983. Banu and he lived in Bandra. They did not have any children. In his autobiography, Dilip Kumar: The Substance and the Shadow, he revealed that Banu had conceived in 1972, but developed complications in the pregnancy, leading to the child's death. Following this, they did not try to have children again, believing it to be God's will.

Kumar was fluent in his native Hindko as well as Urdu, Hindi, Pashto, Punjabi, Marathi, English, Bengali, Gujarati, Persian, and the Bhojpuri and Awadhi dialects. He was also a great music enthusiast and also learnt how to play the sitar for a film. He loved cricket and played it often. He led a cricket team against Raj Kapoor in a friendly cricket match held for charity. Both growing up in Peshawar and in Bombay, Dilip Kumar and his family had a close relationship with the Kapoor family.

His younger brother Nasir Khan (1924–1974) was also a noted film actor. Two of his younger brothers died after testing positive for COVID-19 in 2020, within a space of two weeks.

Death 
Dilip Kumar died at Hinduja Hospital, Mumbai, on 7 July 2021 at 7:30 am, aged 98. He died after a prolonged illness. He had been suffering from several age-related issues and was diagnosed with pleural effusion. The Government of Maharashtra approved his burial with state honours under COVID-19 restrictions at the Juhu Muslim Cemetery that same day.

Expressing their condolences, Prime Minister Narendra Modi stated in a tweet that Kumar would be remembered as a cinematic legend, while the President, Ram Nath Kovind, stated that "he was loved across the subcontinent". The Prime Minister of Pakistan, Imran Khan, also expressed condolences for his death and remembered his efforts in raising funds for the Shaukat Khanum Memorial Cancer Hospital in a tweet. The former President of Afghanistan, Hamid Karzai, and the Prime Minister of Bangladesh, Sheikh Hasina, also expressed condolences to Kumar and his family.

Artistry and legacy 

Kumar is widely considered one of the greatest and most influential actors in the history of Indian cinema, and cinema in general. Kumar was a pioneer of method acting, predating Hollywood method actors such as Marlon Brando. He inspired many great Indian cinema actors from contemporaries like Balraj Sahni to succeeding generations of artists, including Amitabh Bachchan, Shah Rukh Khan, Kamal Haasan, Mammootty, Aamir Khan, Naseeruddin Shah, Nawazuddin Siddiqui among others. Kumar, who pioneered his own form of method acting without any acting school experience, was described as "the ultimate method actor" by renowned filmmaker Satyajit Ray, despite not having worked with him.

Kumar was popularly referred to as "Abhinay Samrat" (Hindi for "Emperor of Acting") by the audience. He was also dubbed in the media as "Tragedy King" because of the acclaimed dramatic roles he took early in his career and is also retrospectively known as "The First Khan" of Bollywood. Other than these, of recent, he is often referred in the media as "The Kohinoor of Indian cinema". Kumar was the biggest Indian star of the 1950s and 1960s era, a national icon and the country's highest paid actor during this period. His prolific period as a leading artist coincides with what retrospectively came to be known as the "Golden Age of Hindi cinema", with him playing a key role in its legacy. Film historian Maithili Rao states, "He towered like a mountain in the middle of Hindi film history, obscuring his predecessors and dwarfing his contemporaries."

He is retrospectively recognised as "The First Superstar of Indian cinema". He became one of the earliest and most revered stars in the history of Indian cinema having legions of fans across the subcontinent and among the South Asian diaspora worldwide. In 2013, on the occasion of centenary of Indian cinema, he was declared the "Biggest superstar of all time" by Filmfare in its poll of the same title.

As of 2020, he is by far, the most successful Bollywood star of all time with over eighty percent box-office successes and numerous gross records. Trade analysts have acknowledged that many of his films were commercially successful despite their heavy theme and non-commercial nature because the masses gathered in cinemas across India only to see him act, a unique feat as anything such hasn't happened with any other actor. This had been particularly apparent in the late 1940s and early 1950s, a period in which he got the title of "Tragedy King" in media outlets. In the review of the last film of his initial phase, the 1976 musical Bairaag, The Hindu, remarked, "For more than 25 years Dilip Kumar was the king at the box office. His name was almost a guarantee of success not only at the time of the release of the film but even in re-runs his films made more money than fresh releases of many of his contemporaries." Renowned director, Hrishikesh Mukherjee, called him "a phenomenon at the time", stating all his films had the hype, "he was absolutely a one-man industry".

In the second phase of his career, which saw him playing mature roles that were the main leads of his films, often driving them to immense success, Box Office India notes, "This was the part of his illustrious career which sets him apart from all other actors as no one else has managed to such success as a character artist." Renowned actor Irrfan Khan, remarked, "Till date, no other actor has had that kind of an impact on people’s hearts. The kind of combination he brought along – of an actor and a star – was never seen before him. It started with him, and ended with him. His career, his working style, his personal lifestyle or his choice of films, nothing sets a wrong example. He is a true legend. These days, the word ‘legend’ is used loosely, but I strongly believe that he is the only one who deserves to be called the legend".

Accolades 

Kumar, Raj Kapoor and Dev Anand together formed "the golden trio" of Indian cinema in 1950s and 1960s, with camaraderie between the three contemporary actors, all renowned for their own style. Kumar was the biggest Indian star of this era, a national icon, holding the status of a  matinée idol. He was the country's highest paid actor during this period.

From the independence of India in 1947 to the late 2010s, Kumar held the record of performing in the highest number of highest-grossing films of the year (9 films), until his record was broken by Salman Khan, who performed in 10 such films. However, as per new reports from Box Office India, highest grossing Indian film in 1991 was Kumar's Saudagar (1991) instead of Khan's Saajan (1991), thus perhaps re-establishing his record.

He is the only actor in India to have delivered at least one bonafide "hit" at the box office for 15 years straight, from 1947 to 1961. He also did not give a single flop in a period of 15 years from 1952 to 1965. According to many sources, he is the only Indian actor to have more than one film (3 or 4) among the top 10 highest grossing films of Indian cinema when adjusted for ticket-price inflation. These films are Naya Daur (1957), Mughal-e-Azam (1960), Gunga Jumna (1961), and Kranti (1981).

Over his career, Kumar received eight Filmfare Awards for Best Actor (with 19 total nominations), the most of any actor (and was also its inaugural recipient), and a Filmfare Lifetime Achievement Award (1993).  He holds the record for most consecutive Filmfare award for Best Actor wins. He also received a Special Recognition Filmfare Award at the 50th Filmfare Awards for being one of the first recipients of Filmfare Awards along with Lata Mangeshkar and Naushad Ali.

Kumar was appointed Sheriff of Mumbai (an honorary position) for 1980. The Government of India honoured Kumar with the Padma Bhushan in 1991, the Dadasaheb Phalke Award in 1994 and the Padma Vibhushan in 2015. The Government of Andhra Pradesh honoured Kumar with NTR National Award in 1997. He was honoured with CNN-IBN's Lifetime Achievement Award in 2009. The Government of Madhya Pradesh honoured Kumar with Rashtriya Kishore Kumar Samman in 2015.

The Government of Pakistan conferred Kumar with the Nishan-e-Imtiaz, the highest civilian award in Pakistan, in 1998. The ruling political party of Shiv Sena in Maharashtra, India, had objected to this award and questioned Kumar's patriotism. However, in 1999, in consultation with the then Prime Minister of India Atal Bihari Vajpayee, Kumar retained the award. Vajpayee declared, "There is no doubt about film star Dilip Kumar's patriotism and commitment to the nation." Kumar later said in his autobiography that returning it "could have only soured relations further and produced bad vibes between India and Pakistan." Many believe this incident prolonged his wait for Bharat Ratna.

The House of Dilip Kumar in Peshawar, Pakistan, was declared as a national heritage monument in 2014 by the then Pakistani Prime Minister Nawaz Sharif.

Kumar was voted the "Greatest Indian Actor of All Time" in a Rediff Readers poll in 2011. He holds the Guinness World Record for having received the most awards by an Indian actor. He was honoured by the World Book of Records on his 97th birthday for his "matchless contribution to Indian cinema and promoting social causes".

References

External links

 
 
 

1922 births
2021 deaths
Indian male film actors
Film directors from Mumbai
Film producers from Mumbai
Indian male voice actors
Recipients of Nishan-e-Imtiaz
Hindi-language film directors
Male actors in Hindi cinema
Sheriffs of Mumbai
Kumar Dilip
Dadasaheb Phalke Award recipients
Indian actor-politicians
Male actors from Mumbai
People from Peshawar
20th-century Indian male actors
Recipients of the Padma Vibhushan in arts
Recipients of the Padma Bhushan in arts
Filmfare Awards winners
Filmfare Lifetime Achievement Award winners
Method actors